Malmköping is a locality situated in Flen Municipality, Södermanland County, Sweden with 1,977 inhabitants in 2010.

Malmköping is located about 15 kilometers north of the municipal seat Flen. It is a tourist attraction due to its many annual markets. The traditions of markets in Malmköping goes back more than two centuries, as Malmköping got market town rights (köping) in 1785.

Olympian Helge Meuller was born here.

Riksdag elections

In literature

Jonas Jonasson's 2009 novel The Hundred-Year-Old Man Who Climbed Out of the Window and Disappeared opens in Malmköping. The movie, however, is recorded in Munkedal, Bohuslän.

References

External links

Populated places in Södermanland County
Populated places in Flen Municipality
Market towns in Sweden